Arthur "Bugs" Baer (January 9, 1886-May 17, 1969) was a journalist and humorist. He was known for his clever, sometimes suggestive, quips, such as one praising pitcher Allen Sothoron: "Allan S. Sothoron pitched his initials off today."

Early life
Baer was born in Philadelphia, Pennsylvania, the seventh of 14 children born to immigrants from Alsace-Lorraine. He left school at age 14 to work, attended art school, and designed lace on a wage of $12 a week. One article from 1918 lists Baer as a notable graduate of the Field Artillery Officers' Training School in Camp Zachary Taylor. Baer also contributed to the 1919 book F.A.C.O.T.S. - The Story of the Field Artillery Central Officers Training School.

A 1921 article shows that Baer played on the New York Newspaper Golf Club team in an intercity New York-Boston journalists' golf match.

Career 
Baer began his career in journalism as an artist with the Philadelphia Public Ledger and later worked for other papers before working as a sports journalist for the Washington Times, where he drew cartoons of a "baseball-bodied insect" named "Bugs." Baer was thereafter known as "Bugs," insisting upon being referred to by this nickname.
One of his famous jokes involved Gavvy Cravath, a Phillies player who, on June 23, 1919, was caught attempting to steal second base. Baer quipped that "his head was sure full of larceny, but his feet were honest."
–a joke that amused William Randolph Hearst so much that he hired Baer to work for the New York American.

Baer was active on Broadway in the 1920s. Among his many credits, he co-authored the third "George White's Scandals" review in 1923, with George White as writer and George Gershwin as a composer. For the new motion picture industry, he wrote the only movie for Babe Ruth in which Ruth played himself. As a ghostwriter, he wrote the continuity for the Mutt and Jeff comic strip for two years in the 1920s. He also served as emcee for various appearances and shows by the syndicated newspaper cartoonists.

Personal life 
Baer married twice. His first wife, Marjorie Cassidy, died suddenly after the birth of his daughter. His second wife, Louise Andrews, mother of his son, was a Ziegfeld Follies girl who became one of the first fund-raisers for heart disease research. She was president-elect of the American Heart Association on her death from heart illness in 1950.

Baer died at age 83 at New York Hospital on May 17, 1969. He was survived by a son, Arthur Bugs Baer, Jr., and a daughter, Atra Cavataro, as well as seven grandchildren. Bugs Jr. graduated from Harvard College and Harvard Business School and became an investment manager, venture capitalist, and yacht racer.

Baer's daughter, Atra Cavataro, was a reporter for the Journal American newspaper for several years, based in New York City. She went on to be a speechwriter for New York Mayor Ed Koch for his 12-year term as mayor.

References

External links

Column from February 1922

1886 births
1969 deaths
American cartoonists
American columnists
Burials at Ferncliff Cemetery
Ghostwriters